Olinto may refer to:

People

Surname
 Antônio Olinto dos Santos Pires (1860-1925), Brazilian politician
 Antônio Olinto Marques da Rocha (1919-2009), Brazilian writer
 Claudio Olinto de Carvalho (1942-2016), also known as Nené, Brazilian footballer
 Angela Olinto (1961-), astrophysicist

Given name
 Olinto De Pretto (1857-1921), Italian scientist
 Olinto Marella (1882-1969), Italian priest
 Olinto Sampaio Rubini (1934-2012), also known as Rubini, Brazilian footballer
 Olinto Silva (born 1960), Venezuelan cyclist

Places
 Antônio Olinto, Paraná, Brazil